Paweł Marek Wszołek (born 30 April 1992) is a Polish professional footballer who plays for Ekstraklasa club Legia Warsaw.

Club career

Polonia Warsaw
Born in Tczew, Poland, Wszołek played at the academies of Wisła Tczew, Lechia Gdańsk and re-joining Wisła Tczew before he left for Polonia Warsaw in the summer of 2009. As a result of joining the academies, Wszołek had to relocate and while at Lechia Gdańsk, he once lived in the dormitory for a month before moving with his mother. Because of this, his family had a financial problem, leading to his mother taking out loan money and once spend the loan money to buy him a car. In the end, as his career progressed, Wszołek helped his mother to pay all the debt and in return, he bought his mother a new apartment.

Wszołek made his senior team debut for Polonia Warsaw on 13 November 2010, coming on as a substitute in the second half, in a 3–1 win over Ruch Chorzów. Wszołek went on to finish the 2011–12 season, making seven appearances.

The 2011–12 season saw Wszołek established himself in the first team and made his first appearance of the season, in the opening game of the season, where he came on as a substitute in the second half and set up a goal for Bruno Coutinho to score the only goal in the game, in a 1–0 win over Lechia Gdańsk. Then on 18 September 2011, Wszołek set up the opener for Tomasz Jodłowiec against Legia Warsaw in the Warsaw derby, in a 2–1 win for Polonia Warsaw. Three days later, on 21 September 2013, Wszołek scored and set up one of the three goals, in a 4–0 win over Ruch Radzionków. It wasn't until on 12 March 2012 when he scored his league goal, in a 4–1 win over Jagiellonia Białystok. Then on 1 April 2012, he set up two goals, in a 3–0 win over Śląsk Wrocław. In the last game of the season, Wszołek scored his second goal for the club, in a 1–1 draw against Podbeskidzie Bielsko-Biała. Wszołek finished the 2011–12 season, making twenty-eight appearances and scoring three times in all competitions.

In the 2012–13 season, Wszołek started the season well when he scored eight goals in the all competition against Miedź Legnica (in which he scored a brace), Lechia Gdańsk (in which he was named Team of the Week Matchday 1) Wisła Kraków (in which he was named Team of the Week Matchday 3), Widzew Łódź, Zagłębie Lubin, Śląsk Wrocław and Bełchatów (in which he was named Team of the Week Matchday 9). In the January transfer window, Wszołek began to attract interest from Serie A clubs and Bundesliga side Schalke and Hannover 96, in which he almost left the club to join them. However, the move collapsed after he failed to show up for the medical. Despite this, Wszołek stayed at the club and continued to be a regular for the rest of the season, scoring two more league goals against Ruch Chorzow and Podbeskidzie. Wszołek went on to finish the 2012–13 season, making twenty-nine appearances and scoring ten times in all competition.

As the 2012–13 season was almost came to an end, Wszołek expressed his desire to leave the club when he filed a request the Polish Football Association to terminate his contract at Polonia Warsaw. It was reported on 6 June 2013 that Wszołek had his contract terminated at the club following an intervention from the Polish Football Association.

Sampdoria
Following the expiry of his contract, Wszołek was linked with a move to Sampdoria and Lech Poznań. Wszołek was expected to be a Sampdoria player on 15 June 2013. However, the move appeared to be uncertain after it has been revealed that Wszołek had yet sign a contract with Sampdoria. After a much confusion, it was finally announced on 9 July 2013 that Wszołek joined Italian Serie A side Sampdoria, signing a four-year contract.

After appearing the first two matches as an unused substitute, Wszołek finally made his Sampdoria debut, where he made his first start and played for 56 minutes before being substituted, in a 2–2 draw against Cagliari. However, throughout the 2013–14 season, Wszołek struggled in the Sampdoria's first team after struggled with language barrier, as he appeared in a few start and spent most of the season on the substitute, making nineteen appearances (making ten starts) in all competition. Despite this, Wszołek scored his first goal for the club on 11 May 2014, in a 5–2 loss against Napoli.

The 2014–15 season saw Wszołek's first team chance even limited at Sampdoria and was given an opportunity to join Bologna in the summer transfer window, but it never happened. To make the matter worst, Wszołek suffered an injury that kept him out throughout 2014. Though he was told by the club that he was set to be loaned out, with clubs like Mouscron and Pescara, Wszołek's departure never happened and stayed at the club for the rest of the season. Nevertheless, Wszołek made his first appearance on 5 January 2015, making his first start before coming off in the second half, in a 3–0 loss against Lazio. In a match against Udinese on 10 May 2015, Wszołek set up one of the four goals, in a 4–0 win. Wszołek finished the season, making seven appearances in all competition.

Hellas Verona
Although he played four times at the start of the season for Sampdoria, the club agreed to loan out Wszołek to fellow Serie A side Hellas Verona for the rest of the season on 31 August 2015.

After appearing on the substitute for the first three matches since joining Hellas Verona, Wszołek made his debut for the club, coming on as a substitute, playing 35 minutes, in a 2–1 loss against Lazio on 27 September 2015. Wszołek set up a goal for Luca Toni, in a 1–1 draw against Sassuolo on 20 December 2015 and four weeks later on 17 January 2016, he set up another goal for Giampaolo Pazzini, in a 1–1 draw against Roma. However, the season was a miserable one for the Mastini, as the team failed to win a game until the 23rd week of the season, defeating Atalanta 2–1, on 3 February 2016, a game in which Wszołek started, as well as, setting up both of the goals. They were subsequently relegated to Serie B. In the last game of the season, Wszołek received a straight red in the 35th minute, in a 3–2 loss against Palermo. After being initially banned for three matches, his suspension was reduced to a one match ban.

On 1 July 2016, Wszołek sealed his permanent move from Sampdoria in a deal worth in the region of £1.25m. Wszołek made one appearance for the club, coming on as a late substitute, in a 1–0 win over Crotone.

Queens Park Rangers (loan)
Wszołek moved to Championship side Queens Park Rangers on transfer deadline day, 31 August 2016, on a season-long loan deal. This was made into a permanent deal on transfer deadline day 31 January 2017 when Queens Park Rangers exercised a clause in the loan deal to sign Wszolek until the summer of 2019.

Wszołek made his Queens Park Rangers debut, where he made his first start and played for 72 minutes in the game before being substituted, in a 6–0 loss against Newcastle United. In the West London derby against Fulham on 1 October 2016, Wszołek set up an opening goal for Conor Washington to score his first goal for the club, in a 2–1 win. In the next game, he scored his first goal, in a 1–1 draw against Reading on 15 October 2016. Wszołek then set up the opener and scored the winning goal on 31 December 2016, in a 2–1 win over Wolverhampton Wanderers, followed up by scoring the winning goal again, in a 2–1 win over Ipswich Town on 2 January 2017.

Queens Park Rangers
On 31 January 2017, halfway through Wszołek's initial loan QPR exercised an option to sign him permanently for an undisclosed fee. Wszołek finished the 2018–19 season with 38 appearances in the league, his most in his three seasons at the club, highlighted by a 17-game stretch across the new year period in which he started every game on the right wing and scored all 4 of his goals on the season.

Legia Warsaw
On 19 September 2019, Wszołek signed with Polish club Legia Warsaw, marking his return to his native country after seven years abroad. He came off the bench for his debut on 6 October in a 2–0 defeat to reigning champions Piast Gliwice. Wszołek entered the starting lineup following the succeeding international break, and scored his first goal for the club in their 7–0 thrashing of Wisła Kraków on 27 October.

Union Berlin
In the summer of 2021, Wszołek joined Union Berlin. He made just one appearance in a 3–1 DFB-Pokal win over Waldhof Mannheim.

Legia Warsaw (loan)
On 27 January 2021, he joined Ekstraklasa side Legia Warsaw on loan for the remainder of the 2021–22 season. Legia were struggling in a relegation battle at the bottom of the table. He scored his first goal for Legia in a 3–1 against Zagłębie Lubin. Wszołek finished the season with 6 goals and 3 assists, and was crucial to Legia’s survival.

Return to Legia Warsaw
On 7 July 2022, Legia announced the permanent signing of Wszołek on a three-year deal until the end of the 2024-25 season, after a successful loan spell.

International career
Wszołek played for the Poland national under-19 football team. In September 2012, Wszołek was called up by the senior national team for the first time. Upon learning of being called up, Wszołek said it was a dream come true for him to be called up.

Wszołek debuted for the Poland national football team on 12 October 2012 in a friendly match against South Africa, which saw Poland win 1–0. In his eighth appearance for the national side against Finland on 26 March 2016, Wszołek scored his first goals, in a 5–0 win. After the match, Wszołek said scoring two goals against Finland was "the best time of his career". On 12 May 2016, Wszołek was called by the national team for the UEFA Euro 2016 preliminary squad. However, Wszołek suffered an elbow injury during a training with the national squad, putting his hopes of being included in the Poland squad in doubt. Following this, it was announced that Wszołek would be cut from the squad because of the injury and would be out for three months after having a surgery.

It wasn't until on 10 October 2016 when Wszołek made his first appearance for Poland since being cut from squad for UEFA Euro 2016, where he came on as a substitute for injured Artur Jędrzejczyk, in a 2–1 win over Armenia.

Personal life
Wszołek was once convicted after he drove his BMW without a driving license and was late for training. In addition, Wszołek struggled in school, as he was missed regularly and was urged by his mother not to quit school; leading him to take an evening course.

In addition to speaking Polish, Wszołek speaks German (having studied it from school), Italian (having learn to adapt from it) and currently learning English.

Career statistics

Club

1 Including EFL Cup.

International

Scores and results list Poland's goal tally first, score column indicates score after each Wszołek goal.

References

External links
 
 

1992 births
Living people
People from Tczew
Sportspeople from Pomeranian Voivodeship
Polish footballers
Association football wingers
Poland international footballers
Poland youth international footballers
Poland under-21 international footballers
Ekstraklasa players
Serie A players
Serie B players
English Football League players
Lechia Gdańsk players
Polonia Warsaw players
U.C. Sampdoria players
Hellas Verona F.C. players
Queens Park Rangers F.C. players
Legia Warsaw players
1. FC Union Berlin players
Polish expatriate footballers
Polish expatriate sportspeople in Italy
Expatriate footballers in Italy
Polish expatriate sportspeople in England
Expatriate footballers in England
Polish expatriate sportspeople in Germany
Expatriate footballers in Germany